In Hindu tradition, Triveni Sangam is the confluence (Sanskrit: sangama) of three rivers that is also a sacred place, with a bath here said to flush away all of one's sins and free one from the cycle of rebirth.

Triveni Sangam in Allahabad (officially Prayagraj) 

Triveni Sangam is the confluence of the Ganges (Ganga), the Yamuna, and the mythical Saraswati River. Triveni Sangam is located at Prayag – the area of Allahabad neighbouring the confluence; for this reason, the confluence is also sometimes referred to as Prayag.

At Triveni Sangam, the Ganges and the Yamuna can be identified by their different colours – the water of the Ganges is clear while that of the Yamuna is greenish in colour. The third river, the mythical Saraswati, is called invisible.

The auspiciousness of the confluence of two rivers is referred to in the Rigveda, which says, "Those who bathe at the place where the two rivers, white and dark, flow together, rise up to heaven."

A place of religious importance and one of the sites for the historic Kumbh Mela held every 12 years, over the years it has also been the site of the immersion of ashes of several national leaders, including Mahatma Gandhi in 1949.

Triveni Sangam in West Bengal 
In the town of Tribeni in  Hooghly district in  West Bengal, the river Bhagirathi Hooghly, one of the two main distributaries of the Ganges splits into three more distributaries which are called Ganga, Jamuna and Saraswati. This place is called Tribeni and is of great religious significance to Hindus. It is believed that the "Yukta Veni" (connected) of Prayag in  Prayagraj becomes "Mukta Veni" (disentangled) in Tribeni Sangam. At present, due to the changing course of the river in this extremely geologically active Bengal delta region, the Jamuna river of Bengal has almost disappeared and the stream of Saraswati is also rather thin, but in the past all three channels used to carry significant portions of the flow.

Triveni Sangam in Gujarat 
The Triveni Sangam in Gujarat is located near Somnath and Veraval in Gir-Somnath district. It marks the confluence of rivers Hiran, Kapila and the Saraswati, where they meet the Arabian Sea on the west coast of India.

Triveni Sangam in Kooduthurai

The Triveni Sangam in Kooduthurai, Erode is a confluence of the Kaveri, Bhavani and Amudha and is known as the South Indian Triveni Sangam, or Dakshina Sangam.

Nepal
Triveni Dham is a confluence of three rivers, Sona, Tamasa and Sapta Gandaki located in Binayi Tribeni Rural Municipality, Nawalparasi district  of Nepal.

Other Triveni Sangams

Bhagamandala

Bhagamandala is a pilgrimage place in Kodagu district of Karnataka. It is situated on the river Kaveri in its upstream stretches. At this place, the Kaveri is joined by two tributaries, the Kannike and the Sujyoti river. It is considered sacred as a river confluence (kudala or triveni sangama, in Kannada and Sanskrit respectively).

Tirumakudalu Narasipura

Tirumakudalu Narasipura, commonly known as T. Narasipura, is a panchayat town in Mysore district in the Indian state of Karnataka. The first name refers to the land at the confluence (trimakuta in Sanskrit) at the confluence of the Kaveri, Kabini and Spatika Sarovara (a lake or spring, also named Gupta Gamini). This is the place in South India where local Kumbhamela is held every three years.

Moovattupuzha

Kaliyar (Kali river), Thodupuzhayar (Thodupuzha river) and Kothayar (Kothamangalam river) merge and become Muvattupuzha river in Kerala and hence this place is called Muvattupuzha.

Munnar

Munnar city is where Mudhirapuzha, Nallathanni and Kundala rivers merge, the name Munnar literally means "three rivers" in Malayalam and Tamil.

Kandakurthi

Kandakurthi is a village in Renjal mandal of Nizamabad district in the Indian state of Telangana. The river Godavari merges with the rivers Manjira and Haridra.

Bhilwara
Bhilwara is a district in the Indian state of Rajasthan. The river Banas merges with the rivers Berach and Menali.

References

Hindu holy cities
Shakti Peethas
Erode
Sacred rivers
Tourism in Uttar Pradesh
Tourism in Tamil Nadu
Tourist attractions in Allahabad
Ganges
Allahabad culture